Wireless station can refer to 

 Two-way radio station
 Radio station
 Wireless telegraph station
 Wireless base station
 The Wireless Station, a historic building in Anchorage, Alaska, US